Sir David Arnold Scott Cairns (5 March 1902 – 8 September 1987), was a British judge and Liberal Party politician.

Background
Cairns was a son of David Cairns JP, a Freeman of Sunderland and Sarah Scott Cairns. He was educated at Bede Grammar School for Boys, Sunderland and Pembroke College, Cambridge. In 1932 he married Irene Cathery Phillips. They had one son and two daughters. He was knighted in 1955. He was made a member of the Privy Council in 1970.

Political career
He was Liberal candidate for the Epsom division of Surrey at the 1947 Epsom by-election. 

He did not stand for parliament again. However, the following year he was elected to Leatherhead Urban District Council. He served for two three-year terms. He was also actively involved inside the Liberal Party on policy development. From 1948-49 he was Chairman of the Liberal Party Commission on Trade Unions. From 1951-53 he was a member of the Liberal Party Committee.

Professional career
Cairns was Chairman of the Monopolies and Restrictive Practices Commission. He was Lord Justice of Appeal from 1970-77. He presided over a number of notable enquieries and cases;
Exxon Corp v Exxon Insurance Consultants International Ltd
Re Gray's Inn Construction Co Ltd
1953 Nutts Corner BEA Vickers Viking accident
Stonegate Securities Ltd v Gregory
Nethermere (St Neots) Ltd v Gardiner

References

1902 births
1987 deaths
Liberal Party (UK) parliamentary candidates
People educated at Bede Grammar School for Boys
Alumni of Pembroke College, Cambridge
Members of the Middle Temple
20th-century English judges
Members of the Privy Council of the United Kingdom
Lords Justices of Appeal